Rope rescue is a subset of technical rescue that involves the use of rope, be it steel or cable rope, or more commonly used nylon, polyester, or other type of rope. Kernmantle (kern = core and mantle = sheath) rope as it is called, is available in various types: dynamic (stretches to absorb the shock of a falling lead climber or rescue professional) or static (actually low stretch) which is most commonly used in rescue and industrial rope work. Anchoring includes using specialty anchors, as well as things as simple as a length of chain, cable, rope, or webbing wrapped around a pillar, tree, boulder, or such. They provide the security and a point from which a person or subject (the word victim has dropped, and changed to subject, due to the negative implications of the term victim) can be belayed. Belaying is the act of protecting the climber, rescue professional, or subject in the event of a fall. Various other devices used, including friction rappel (lowering) devices, which acts as a braking device on the rope. They are used for lowering a load, a subject or oneself (rappelling). Pulleys can serve as a mechanical advantage, along with rope grabs, and other tools, to raise, or haul, a load up a vertical section, or across a gully or canyon. Pulleys systems are used in conjunction with the rope, rope grabbing devices, i.e.: Prusiks, or mechanical grabs, to capture the progress made during the lift. Since pulley systems are generally short in length, they are used in conjunction with a progress (raise) capturing technique, and a long rope; and a backup safety or belay. This specialized equipment is used to reach the subject(s) and safely recover them.

These techniques are subdivided, and are sometimes the techniques and equipment are modified to better suit the specialty area. The subdivisions are: high angle urban/structural/mine rescue, wilderness/river/mountain rescue, and cave rescue. As a rule, urban or industrial rope rescue involves heavier equipment, which is chosen due to the close proximity to cities. Also due to this fact long approaches and lengthy extractions are not required. Wilderness and cave rescue generally involve a long approach to the rescue site, thus lighter weight equipment is desirable, and often required, so it can be carried/transported these great distances, or through tight passages, etc.. Due to this fact they usually involve extended rescue times as well. Although there is significant overlap in techniques and concepts, the two skill sets are often quite different and may not be interchangeable. What works in an urban environment may be cumbersome, clumsy, or ineffective in a wilderness or natural cave environment, or vice versa.

The key to any type of rescue is understanding and identifying the principles which are involved. Once the principles are identified, appropriate techniques or methods, which fits the circumstances, can be determined and applied. More recently, noncommittal vertical rescue techniques have been introduced. These skills make it possible to rescue a subject from a vertical environment without exposing the rescue professional (volunteer or paid) to the danger or risk of the vertical environment. These techniques involve skills used to rescue an individual(s) from their precarious situation, without sending a rescue professional over the edge or suspending them from the rope and safety equipment. An example of one such technique is the clip, snip, and lower/raise technique. It is often used for fall recovery and rescue. This technique involves using a specialty extension stick or pole to attach a rope to the subject. Once the rope is securely attached to the subject, they are either raised (hauled) up or lowered down to waiting emergency personnel.

In the United States, urban/structural rope rescue performed by professional rescue agencies such as EMS, fire departments and volunteer groups, such as Sheriff Department rescue teams, etc., have organizations such as National Fire Protection Association (NFPA 1670, ANSI, and others, along with governmental agencies like OSHA, NIOSH, MSAH, etc. help provide guidelines, suggestions, and regulations. The Code of Federal Regulation (CFR) addresses a number of situations, include confined space rescue, 29 CFR 1910.146 and 29 CFR 1910.147. In most cases, wilderness rope rescue is not specifically covered by such mandates (except in the case where the wilderness rescue is carried out by governmental organizations).

Rescue should not be attempted by individuals who have not been formally trained. Local rescue authorities, fire departments, sheriff departments, etc. may be able to provide information on rope rescue training, practice, and equipment, and organizations who are actively looking for members. Courses exist that provide training towards the following qualifications: emergency medical responder (first responder, EMT, paramedic), heavy rescue technician, rope rescue technician, trench rescue technician, confined space rescue technician, hazardous materials technician, and swiftwater rescue technician.

NFPA (a private organization) suggestions 1006 and 1670 (a non mandatory set of guidelines, which can be adopted by various agencies and implemented as regulation) say that all "rescuers" must have medical training to perform any technical rescue operation, including cutting the vehicle itself during an extrication. Therefore, in most all rescue environments, whether it is an EMS Department or Fire Department that runs the rescue, the actual rescuers who cut the vehicle and run the extrication scene or perform any rescue such as rope, low angle, etc., are likely to be medical first responders, emergency medical technicians, or a paramedics.

See also 
Cave rescue
Rescue squad
Emergency Medical Services
911th Engineer Company (Technical Rescue)
Rescue
Multnomah County Sheriff's Office Search and Rescue
Marin County Sheriff's Office Search & Rescue

Rescue